Walcha Road railway station is a heritage-listed railway station located on the Main Northern line in Walcha Road, Walcha Shire, New South Wales, Australia. The railway station serves the village of Walcha Road and town of Walcha, opening on 2 August 1882 when the line was extended from Kootingal to Uralla. It is also known as Walcha Road Railway Station and yard group. The property was added to the New South Wales State Heritage Register on 2 April 1999.

Services
Walcha Road station is served by NSW TrainLink's daily Northern Tablelands Xplorer service operating between Armidale and Sydney.

Description 
Buildings in the complex comprise a standard roadside station, type 4, completed in 1882, with a brick platform face; a signal box with a skillion roof on platform,  1914; a residence for a night officer, type 6, brick, and completed in 1882; and a loading bank.

Heritage listing 
The station complex is an intact standard roadside station with only minor detail altered. As such it is a rare surviving example. The signal box added for the yard layout is a typical simple on-platform box. The station was later provided with a second platform behind the original building, a rather unusual situation in the country, but this was removed in 1993 and the layout rebuilt.
The residence is a good example of a simple symmetrical brick residence with detached front verandah. Its position overlooking the station enhances the sites significance.

Walcha Road railway station was listed on the New South Wales State Heritage Register on 2 April 1999 having satisfied the following criteria.

The place possesses uncommon, rare or endangered aspects of the cultural or natural history of New South Wales.

This item is assessed as historically rare. This item is assessed as archaeologically rare. This item is assessed as socially rare.

See also

References

Bibliography

Attribution

External links

Walcha Road station details Transport for New South Wales

New South Wales State Heritage Register
New England (New South Wales)
Articles incorporating text from the New South Wales State Heritage Register
Railway stations in Australia opened in 1882
Regional railway stations in New South Wales
Main North railway line, New South Wales